Phoenix–Mesa Gateway Airport , formerly Williams Gateway Airport (1994–2008) and Williams Air Force Base (1948–1993), is an international airport in the southeastern area of Mesa, Arizona,  southeast of Phoenix, in Maricopa County. The airport, owned and operated by the Phoenix–Mesa Gateway Airport Authority, is a reliever airport for Phoenix Sky Harbor International Airport. It is a base for Allegiant Air.

The FAA's National Plan of Integrated Airport Systems for 2007–2011 called Phoenix–Mesa Gateway a reliever airport, which is a general aviation airport used to relieve congestion at a large airline airport. Allegiant Air began scheduled service from Mesa in October 2007. Phoenix Mesa Gateway Airport reports the airport had 1,774,763 passenger boardings in 2019. Most U.S. airports use the same three-letter location identifier for the FAA and IATA, but Phoenix–Mesa Gateway Airport has different codes for each. The aviation community generally uses the FAA code of IWA, while commercial passenger-flight organizations use the IATA code of AZA.

History

The airport was built in 1941 as Higley Field. It was renamed Williams Field on February 24, 1942, in honor of Arizona native First Lieutenant Charles Linton Williams (1898–1927), who was killed while serving with the 19th Pursuit Squadron at Wheeler Field, Oahu, when he had to ditch his Boeing PW-9A, 26-353, in the Pacific Ocean about a mile off of Fort DeRussy. The fort was located in the then-named Territory of Hawaii (Hawaii would become a state in 1959). In 1948, Williams Field was acquired by the US military and renamed Williams Air Base. It was a flight-training field during World War II.

In 1948, Williams became the first jet training base. In 1966, it was the first site of the Undergraduate Pilot Training program. The 1991 Base Realignment and Closure Commission recommended closing the base, and it closed in 1993.

As the base was being shut down, growing traffic at Sky Harbor International Airport in Phoenix was figured to warrant an alternative airport. The runway was expanded to accommodate airliners, and the facility opened in 1994 as Williams Gateway Airport. Bids were submitted by some airlines to begin flights almost immediately.

In 2004, charter airline Ryan International Airlines began MD-82 flights to Bullhead City International Airport in Bullhead City, Arizona, next to Laughlin, Nevada, and many resorts. In recent years, the airport again became a center of flight training. Flight schools take advantage of the clear weather in the Phoenix valley.

On July 31, 2007, the low-cost Las Vegas-based carrier Allegiant Air announced plans to open a focus city at Phoenix–Mesa Gateway Airport, connecting the Phoenix area to 13 cities. Service commenced on October 25, 2007, with cities being added until November 21, 2007. In a September 17, 2007 press release, the Williams Gateway Airport Authority governing board approved a name change for Williams Gateway Airport effective October 15 to Phoenix–Mesa Gateway Airport.

On June 16, 2015, after Elite Airways announced non-stop flights from San Diego and Salt Lake City to Phoenix–Mesa, Allegiant threatened to leave the airport. This was primarily due to the incentives the airport is offering to Elite. If Allegiant were to leave, it would consider relocating to the nearby Phoenix Sky Harbor International Airport.

On January 21, 2017, Phoenix–Mesa welcomed its first international flight and first two international destinations, as Westjet inaugurated its seasonal service to Calgary and Edmonton, Alberta. Westjet had seen success at Phoenix Sky Harbor for years, with Calgary and Edmonton being the first and sixth-most popular international destinations at Sky Harbor, respectively.

On May 3, 2021, Phoenix–Mesa welcomed Avelo Airlines, which is based at Hollywood-Burbank Airport. The service was short lived and the airline's final flight to/from Phoenix-Mesa Gateway was on August 16, 2021.

Board of directors
In 1994, the Phoenix–Mesa Gateway Airport Authority was established with a three-member board with representation from the three cities immediately adjacent to the then-named Williams Field. The original governing board consisted of the mayors of the towns of Gilbert and Queen Creek and the city of Mesa. Reflecting the growth of the airport, the Gila River Indian Community joined the board in 1995, with the cities of Phoenix and Apache Junction subsequently joining in 2006 and 2013.

Facilities
 12C/30C: , asphalt/concrete
 12L/30R: , concrete
 12R/30L: , concrete

In the year ending October 31, 2021, the airport had 273,672 aircraft operations averaging 749 per day, with 77% general aviation, 16% air taxi, 5% airline, and 2% military. In 2021, 130 aircraft were based at the airport – 66 single-engined, 16 multi-engined, 27 jet, and 21 helicopters.

Airlines and destinations

Passenger

Other
 Air Evac International (Medevac airline)
 Fighter Combat International

Training
 Advanced Training Systems International
 ATP Flight School
 Aviation Performance Solutions
 University of North Dakota Aerospace Foundation
 Chandler–Gilbert Community College

Statistics

Top destinations

Annual traffic

Airline market share

Future plans
The number of passengers has increased greatly since Allegiant Air started operations. IWA/AZA did not anticipate this growth within the first year. Due to an increase from 14,588 enplanements in 2007 to 159,481 in 2008, facilities were becoming crowded. This added eight gates since IWA/AZA was established in 1994. The airport broke ground on an expansion plan in early 2013, to increase gates to ten. However, because IWA/AZA is running out of real estate on the west side of the airfield, a halt to further expansions will occur until East terminal facilities are built.

East Side Terminal plans
In response to the expansion issues, PMGAA began planning for a new east terminal. The plan, titled Gateway 2030, was developed in June 2012. The plan will be implemented in four phases. With the completion of phase one, IWA/AZA will be able to accommodate 1.5 million enplanements (3 million passengers). Much of phase one will address infrastructure for the new terminal. The addition will include access roads, parking, taxiways, aprons capable of Group III and IV aircraft, and the new  pier concept terminal. The new terminal will have 14 gates, constructed to make room for 12 Group III aircraft and two Group IV aircraft.

Phase two has yet to be planned in detail, but will add another pier terminal to the main concourse, adding up to six gates, parking for 10,500 vehicles, and a  extension of RW 12L/30R. Phase two will enable IWA/AZA to handle 2.2 million enplanements. Phase three for the Gateway 2030 plan will add another pier terminal and second level to the main concourse and will create an additional eight gates, a new apron, more parking, and an additional taxiway.

Phase three will focus on privately owned retail, office, and hotel buildings that will be located on airport property. Phase three will allow IWA to accommodate 5 million enplanements.

Phase four will complete the 2030 plan, allowing IWA able to handle 10 million enplanements (20 million passengers) annually with a total of 60 gates and 21,000 vehicle parking spaces. Phase four will likely not be undertaken until 2030 or beyond, making cost estimates nearly impossible.

Due to the changing market, phase two, three, and four are likely to change. Gateway 2030 is estimated to cost more than $1.4 billion.

Private Development

On November 9, 2021, Gulfstream Aerospace Corporation announced that the airport would be the site for the West Coast Service Center Maintenence, Repair and Overhaul (MRO) facility. The construction cost would be more than $100 million and include a 225,000-square-foot facility in Phase One. 

On July 14, 2022, Virgin Galactic Holdings, Inc. announced it had signed a long-term lease for a new final assembly manufacturing facility for its next-generation Delta class spaceships. The facility will be capable of producing up to six spaceships per year and will bring hundreds of highly skilled aerospace engineering and manufacturing jobs to the area.

Ground transportation 
By road, the airport terminal is served by Sossaman Road. Travelers can access Sossaman Road by exiting at either Hawes or Power Road, which are fed by the Arizona State Route Loop 202, and turning onto Ray Road.

There are several taxis, limousine, ride share and shuttle companies to local hotels, the nearby ASU Polytechnic Campus and downtown Mesa. Multiple car rental agencies are available inside of the arrivals lobby.

Valley Metro bus route 184 stops at the terminal building before heading north to Mesa.

Travelers can park at the hourly or daily parking lots and walk to the terminal. There is also an economy lot, south of the airfield, which is served by a complimentary shuttle to the main terminal.

Historic landmarks

See also

 Phoenix Sky Harbor International Airport
 Williams Air Force Base
 Arizona World War II Army Airfields
 List of airports in Arizona

References

External links
 Phoenix–Mesa Gateway Airport, official website
 Phoenix–Mesa Gateway Airport (IWA) at Arizona DOT airport directory
 Williams Air Force Base at GlobalSecurity.org
 
 

Airports in Maricopa County, Arizona
Buildings and structures in Mesa, Arizona
Transportation in Mesa, Arizona